Carpal collateral ligament may refer to:

 Ulnar carpal collateral ligament
 Radial carpal collateral ligament